The 2001–02 Japan Ice Hockey League season was the 36th season of the Japan Ice Hockey League. Six teams participated in the league, and Kokudo Ice Hockey Club won the championship.

Regular season

Playoffs

External links
 Season on hockeyarchives.info

Japan
Japan Ice Hockey League seasons
Japan
Japan